Alexei Alexeyevich Menshikov (born 11 March 1984) is a Russian former pair skater. With Elena Efaieva, he placed sixth at the 2005 World Junior Championships and at the 2007 European Championships. After ending his competitive career, he turned to coaching.

Programs 
(with Efaieva)

Competitive highlights
(with Efaieva)

References

External links

 

Russian male pair skaters
Figure skaters at the 2007 Winter Universiade
1984 births
Sportspeople from Perm, Russia
Living people